Puusepa is a village in Võru Parish, Võru County in southern Estonia.

References

 

Villages in Võru County
Võru Parish